The 2012 Asian Cycling Championships took place at the Cheras Velodrome in Kuala Lumpur, Malaysia from 8 to 18 February 2012.

Medal summary

Road

Men

Women

Track

Men

Women

Medal table

References
 Official Results

External links
 Malaysia Cycling Federation

Asia
Asia
Cycling
Asian Cycling Championships
2012 in Asian sport
International cycle races hosted by Malaysia